Iris stolonifera is a plant species in the genus Iris; it is also in the subgenus Iris, and in the section Regelia. It is a rhizomatous perennial, from the mountains of Turkestan, between Tajikistan, Uzbekistan and Afghanistan. It has red-skinned stolon roots and rhizomes, glaucous, long, blue-grey leaves, and bi-coloured flowers, in various shades from milky white, to blue, purple, pale lilac, lavender and brown. It normally has blue to yellow beards on all the petals.

Description
At the end of each stolon, it forms a new rhizome, creating widespread colonies of plants. Other 'Regelia section' irises also have stolons.
Also Iris japonica, Iris prismatica and Iris henryi produce stolons.

It has dark blue-green, or glaucous leaves. They are prominently veined, and semi-evergreen, disappearing after summer, after the blooming period is over.  
 

The stems hold 2–3 terminal (top of stem) flowers, blooming in late spring, between April and June, or May, or between May and June.

They are variable in colour, normally bi-coloured, ranging from milky white, to blue, to purple, (or pale lilac, or lavender,) and brown. 
They normally have a blue (or pale lilac,) centre with a brown, or reddish-bronze, or yellow margin.

It has two pairs of petals, three large sepals (outer petals), known as the 'falls' and three inner, smaller petals (or tepals), known as the 'standards'. Each petal has a beard. Which is also variable, normally blue, or yellow, or between blue and yellow, Also lilac, and cream beards have been found.

It has a brown, 2.5 cm long perianth tube, which is funnel shaped. It has 3 cm long styles, which are variable in colour. It has cream or blue coloured pollen.

It is slightly inflated, and tapers at both ends. Inside the capsule, are light brown seeds that have thick white aril (coatings).

Biochemistry
As most irises are diploid, having two sets of chromosomes, this can be used to identify hybrids and classification of groupings. It has a chromosome count: 2n=44.

Taxonomy

It has the common names of 'Pamiriris'.

It is known as 'Pobegonosy Iris' in Russia.

The Latin specific epithet stolonifera derives from its thin stolon-like roots. (See description for more details.)

It was first collected by Olga Fedtschenko in around 1870,

It was first published and described by Karl Maximovich in the 'Bull. Acad. Imp. Sci. Saint-Pétersbourg' Vol.26 on page 535 in 1880. It was also published in 'Mélanges Biol. Bull. Phys.-Math. Acad. Imp. Sci. Saint-Pétersbourg' (Diagn. pl. nov. asiat. or 'Diagnoses Plantarum Asiaticarum') Vol. 10 on page 731 in 1880.

It was also published with an illustration in Curtis's Botanical Magazine 7861 in 1902, and in Hort. Vol. 7 Issue 8 page 191 on 15 April 1929.

Iris stolonifera is an accepted name by the RHS, and it was verified by United States Department of Agriculture and the Agricultural Research Service on 2 October 2014.

Distribution and habitat

Iris stolonifera is native to temperate areas of central Asia.

Range
It is found in the mountain ranges of the Pamir Alai (or Alay),  (including the Gissar Range, and Saravschan Range,).
which passes through the former Russian (or Soviet), country of Turkestan. (including near Bokhara,)

It is also found in Tajikistan, (from the city of Dushanbe, to Uzbekistan, (including near the city of Samarkand near the Baysun ridge, and in the 'Kitab Zapovednik' (Geoological) reserve in the Kashkadarya Province,) and in Afghanistan.

Habitat
It grows on dry rock slopes, along dry creeks, and upland meadows.

One reference (Flora of S.S.S.R.) mentions wet meadows and stream sides, also mentioned by the British Iris Society Guide, but herbarium specimens do not support this habitat, also the other irises in the Regelia section are also mountainside irises.

Cultivation
It is very cold hardy, to USDA Zone 5, or between Zone 5 to Zone 8. It is also hardy in Europe to Zone H3. In very cold areas, such as Russia, the plant may die out after 2 or 3 years.

It prefers to grow in well-drained soils, which are rich in humus.
It can tolerate soils with a ph level of 6.8.

It prefers positions in full sun.
It needs a dormant dry period (or drought) during the summer.

The plants are not tolerant of winds.

In non-hardy places, it is best grown in a bulb frame.
It can be also grown in rock garden.

The plants should be planted at a depth of 2 inches, in October.

It is thought to be one of the easiest 'Regelia' section irises to cultivate, as it is more adaptable and vigorous than others.

Hybrids and cultivars
Iris stolonifera has been crossed with Iris korolkowii to create different coloured hybrids that have dark brown or deep blue beards. It has been crossed with other irises but did not produce very suitable crosses.

There are several different cultivars, including  'Chocolate', 'Decorated Blue Beard', 'Decorated Delight', 'Decorated Giant', 'George Barr', 'Here I Am', 'Leichtlini', 'Merlin's Magic', 'Network', 'Real Harmony', 'Red, White, And Blue', 'Conical', 'Turkish Dancer', 'Turkish Delight', 'Vaga', and 'Zwanenburg Beauty'.

'Zwanenburg Beauty' has blue (or blue white ) flowers that are edged in bronze  and have bronze veins. It has lilac shading on the falls. The beard is bronze-red  or cream-white.

References

Sources
 Aldén, B., S. Ryman & M. Hjertson. 2009. Våra kulturväxters namn – ursprung och användning. Formas, Stockholm (Handbook on Swedish cultivated and utility plants, their names and origin).
 Czerepanov, S. K. 1995. Vascular plants of Russia and adjacent states (the former USSR).
 Dykes, The Genus Iris, page 126, 1913
 Khassanov, F. O. & N. Rakhimova. 2012. Taxonomic revision of the genus Iris L. (Iridaceae Juss.) for the flora of Central Asia. Stapfia 97:177.
 Komarov, V. L. et al., eds. 1934–1964. Flora SSSR.
 Mathew, B. 1981. The Iris. 64.

External links
Has many galleries of images of the iris
Has many images of the iris in its habitat

stolonifera
Flora of Afghanistan
Flora of Tajikistan
Flora of Central Asia
Flora of Uzbekistan
Garden plants of Asia
Plants described in 1880